The Roman Catholic Diocese of Trujillo (erected 3 July 1987) is a suffragan of the Archdiocese of San Pedro Sula.

History

The Diocese of Trujillo was founded as the Diocese of Honduras; in 1561, the Diocese of Comayagua was established on territory split off from the Diocese of Trujillo and in 1571 gained its mother bishopric's remaining territory at its suppression (Trujillo would however be restored in 1987).

Ordinaries
Virgilio López Irias, O.F.M. (1987–2004)
Luis Felipe Solé Fa, C.M. (2005– )

See also
Roman Catholicism in Honduras

References

External links

Trujillo
Trujillo
1987 establishments in Honduras
Trujillo
Roman Catholic Ecclesiastical Province of Tegucigalpa